Fan Zhongyan (5 September 989 – 19 June 1052), courtesy name Xiwen, was a Chinese poet, politician, philosopher, writer, military strategist, and notable scholar-official of the Song dynasty. After serving the central government for several decades, Fan was appointed Prime Minister or Chancellor over the entire Song empire. Fan's philosophical, educational and political contributions continue to be influential to this day, and his writings remain a core component of the Chinese literary canon. His attitude towards official service is encapsulated by his oft-quoted line on the proper attitude of scholar-officials: "They were the first to worry the worries of All-under-Heaven, and the last to enjoy its joys". Fan is one of the most prominent members of the Fan family and is considered one of the most renowned scholars of China, alongside the philosophers Confucius and Mencius.

Family History
Fan Zhongyan traces his lineage to Emperor Yao, Emperor Ku, and Emperor Huang.  Emperor Yao is a 5th generation descendant of Emperor Huang (or Yellow Emperor), and the second son of Emperor Ku.  Often extolled as the morally perfect and intelligent sage-emperor, Emperor Yao became the founding father of the “Power Bestowing System”, by abdicating his throne and bestowing the Emperor-hood to Shun instead of his own children to make Shun the Emperor Shun, an act appraised by Confucianism as “Power Bestowing” for several thousand years.  Emperor Yao's benevolence and diligence served as a model to future Chinese monarchs and emperors.

During the Zhou Dynasty, Dubo, a 51st generation decedent of Emperor Yao, the monarch of the TangDu Kingdom and a Marquis by hereditary, exhorted the then King Zhou Xuan, and was killed by King Zhou Xuan.  His family left Kingdom Zhou to other Kingdoms subsequently. Shihui, a descendant of Dubo, later became the grand marshal and governed the Jin Kingdom (see Jin dynasty).  Shihui is the first person to have “Fan” as family name.  He was conferred the name Fàn with the territory of Fan (in Henan Province today) by the King of the Jin Dynasty, and has been called Fan Wuzi (BC 660 - BC 583, see Fan Clan since. From there, the Fan family became one of the most prominent governing families in the Jin Dynasty, and the most powerful of the six controlling families of the Jin Dynasty at the end of the Spring and Autumn period.

Among Fan Zhongyan’s famous ancestors, there is Fan Li, a prominent businessman from the Spring and Autumn period, who was the Chancellor of Kingdom Qi, a prominent statesman, military strategist, and the founding father of the Chinese commercial business who is worshiped as the "God of Prosperity" (or Caishen) by the Chinese.  Fan Li was the lover and husband of Xi Shi, the No.1 of the renowned Four Beauties of ancient China, and said to be the most beautiful Chinese woman of all time.  Fan Zhongyan's other ancestors include Fan Ju (d. 255 BCE), a powerful chancellor of the Qin Dynasty.  Fan Zhongyan is also a descendant of Fan Lübing, a Grand Chancellor (see Grand councilor) of the Tang Dynasty.  Fan Zhongyan’s close ancestors all served as officials in the imperial governments.  His grandfather Fan Zanshi famously passed the Imperial examination at age nine as a child prodigy.

All four sons of Fan Zhongyan served as officials in the imperial government of the Song Dynasty, and two of them Fan Chunren and Fan Chunli also became Chancellors of China.  Among Fan Zhongyan and his sons, and the families married with Fan Zhongyan's family, together there were eight Chancellors, indicating the powerful influence of Fan Zhongyan's family on the Song Dynasty at the time.

Fan Mengli : Fan Zhongyan's great grand father, conferred as Duke of Xu  posthumously
Fan Zanshi : Fan Zhongyan's grand father, conferred as Duke of Cao  and Duke of Tang  posthumously
Fan Yong : Fan Zhongyan's father, conferred as Duke of Su  and Duke of Zhou  posthumously

Living descendants of Fan Zhongyan include Fan Lei, a famous American musician currently teaching at the Central Conservatory of Music in Beijing, China.

Early life
Fan Zhongyan, from Wu County of Suzhou, was born in Xu Prefecture (of Jiangsu Province) at a government residence. His father Fan Yong had been serving as an official of the government at different locations, and died in Xu Prefecture the subsequent year after Fan Zhongyan was born.  Fan Zhongyan's mother Lady Xie returned to Suzhou and buried her husband at Fàn Clan's ancestral burial ground Tianping Mountain.  Two years later, due to poverty and no financial means, Lady Xie remarried Zhu Wenhan, a government official at the Wu County.  Fan Zhongyan's name was subsequently changed to Zhu Yue. Fan Zhongyan moved with step-father Zhu and mother Lady Xie to different places where Zhu took governmental posts.  Always feeling grateful to step-father Zhu's kindness, Fan tried to pay back to Zhu's family after becoming very successful.

Fan Zhongyan studied in residence at Changbai Mountain Jiuquan Temple as a young boy.  It's said he lived in hardship with very little food everyday, but he never cared about it and instead persisted on learning.  He read almost all the books available at the Changbai county.

After learning his Fan family origin as a young adult by accident, Fan Zhongyan bid farewell to his mother Lady Xie.  He traveled far away to today's Shanxi province, befriended Taoist priests Zhou Debao, Qu Yingyuan, and other intellectuals such as Wang Zhu. The experience broadened Fan's views about the world.  In year 1011, Fan started schooling at the Yingtian Institute (in today's Henan Shangqiu ), the head of the Big Four Institutes (similar to today's big four universities).  He lived an austere lifestyle but studied very hard days and nights. After several years, he had mastered different classics books, and established his aspiration of being generous and taking the world as his responsibilities.

In 1015, he successfully passed the Imperial Examination and became a Jinshi, after which he returned to using the Fan surname and received his mother again to provide for her.

Early official career

In the 1020s, Fan served a variety of regional posts, including as magistrate for the Jiqing Army (in modern-day Bozhou, Anhui), and as a salt store inspector in Taizhou. He then became the county magistrate of Xinghua County (in modern-day coastal Jiangsu), where with his colleague and friend Teng Zongliang he engaged in a series of dyke-building activities along the coastal counties. Not long after the completion of this project, Fan's mother died and he resigned his post for filial mourning.

In the 1030s, Fan served as the prefect of Kaifeng.  While there, he took on a young Ouyang Xiu as a disciple; a partnership that would become very important a decade later.  However, after criticizing the Chief Councillor of the Song state when he submitted a proposal to reform criteria used in the advancement and demotion of officials, he was demoted to regional government.

In 1038, faced with the revolt of Li Yuanhao, the court dispatched Fan along with Han Qi to Shanxi, to inspect the defences; they rendered effective support to the ending of the revolt. Fan was recalled in 1040 when the Liao and Western Xia once again threatened Song borders from the north.  Fan, who had long favored a strong defense, was brought back to devise a response to the northern threat.

Qingli Reforms

After the Song dynasty granted the Western Xia indemnities similar to those granted to the Liao dynasty in the Chanyuan Treaty, Fan, along with other advocates of Confucian ideals, sought reform at the court.  He presented a ten-point proposal covering various aspects of government administration, including reforms to the recruitment system, higher pay for minor local officials to discourage corruption, and wider sponsorship programs to ensure that officials were drafted more on the basis of their intellect and character. However, many of the reforms that he introduced met with the opposition of conservative ministers who felt the system did not need drastic changes (and who felt threatened by the prospect of change halfway through their careers as state bureaucrats). The emperor rescinded the reforms in 1045, after Fan and his friend and colleague Ouyang Xiu had been charged with forming a faction, which was considered subversive by definition. Nevertheless, his idealist approach to governance inspired others, like the later Chancellor Wang Anshi.

Educational reforms
Fan also began educational reforms in the 1040s. In the early Northern Song era, prefectural schools were neglected by the state and were left to the devices of wealthy patrons who provided private finances. While Chancellor, Fan Zhongyan issued an edict that would have a combination of government funding and private financing to restore and rebuild all prefectural schools that had fallen into disuse and abandoned since the Five Dynasties and Ten Kingdoms (907-960). Fan attempted to restore all county-level schools in the same manner, but did not designate where funds for the effort would be formally acquired and the decree was not taken seriously until the later Emperor Huizong of Song who expanded the county-level school system dramatically. Fan's trend of government funding for education set in motion the movement of public schools that eclipsed private academies, which would not be officially reversed until Emperor Lizong of Song in the mid 13th century.

Literary works
Fan Zhongyan's most famous work of literature is On Yueyang Tower. The descriptive prose piece was composed at the invitation of Teng Zongliang, who was then the local prefect and had rebuilt the famed ancient tower. Yueyang Lou, a city gate by the side of Dongting Lake, was known as one of the three great towers in Southern China, due to their association with famous literary works (the others being Yellow Crane Tower and Pavilion of Prince Teng).

This piece contains a very famous line on the role of scholar-officials in China, which describes their ideal state of mind: "They were the first to worry the worries of All-under-Heaven, and the last to enjoy its joys" "". These lines sum up the scholar-official's idealised self-image of self-denial and loyal service.

 is also a famous quotation of his. This quote comes from Ling Wu Fu 《》 in 1036, which was written in reply to the advice of a friend. That friend, Mei Yaochen,, tried to persuade him to stop bearing so much concern for others "under heaven" and to start caring for his own career and life. In response, Fan told a fable about a spirit bird, using the metaphor to express his aspirations. It embodies the moral integrity, sound conscience, and responsibility for others required of a scholar-official, called "The Moral Responsibilities of Intellectuals".

Fan Zhongyan was known for his ci poetry. Among the most famous are Su Mu Zhe and Yu Jia Ao. Together with Su Shi, he was considered one of the founders of the haofang school of ci.

Family

Fan Zhongyan and his wife who from Peng Clan had four sons, all of whom also entered the government: 
Fan Chunyou (1024—1063)
Fan Chunren (1027—1101), Chancellor of the Song Dynasty, prominent member of the conservative faction during the Wang Anshi Reforms, ratified as the Duke of Zhongxuan posthumously
Fan Chunli (1031一1106), Chancellor of the Song Dynasty, ratified as the Duke of Gongxian posthumously
Fan Chuncui (1046—1117)

Overseas Branch Descendants
Fan Zhongyan had many descendants. According to the Book of Gaoping Fan Clan Genealogy, his 9th descendant is Fan Fachuan who lived at Meixian in Guangdong Province and truly integrated into Hakka Chinese society.
Fan Daliang, 12th descendant from Fan Fachuan and 21st descendant from Fan Zhongyan who migrated to Nanyang or Southeast Asia and arrived in 1879 at Cirebon, West Java, Indonesia when he was 18. Fan Daliang had another spelling name in Indonesia because influenced by the spelling of the Dutch language: "Hoan Tat Liang" or "Hoan Tat Liong". The second name of Fan Daliang is Hoan Tje Huang as a kleermaker, garment business owner, and fabric shop owner. Hoan Tat Liang had seven children by married to Sundanese women who called Arengsih or Nyai Hoan Tat Liang.

Sons :
Fan Binghe or Hoan Piang Ho married to Boen Ih Nio
Fan Linhe or Hoan Lin Ho married to Jao Jen Moy and Oey Roe Nio
Fan Honghe or Hoan Fung Ho married to Oey Hap Nio

Daughters:
Fan Cainiang or Hoan Tjai Nio married to Kang Boen Hie
Fan Caifeng or Hoan Tjai Hoeng married to Tjiong Clan
Fan Caiding or Hoan Tjai Tin married to Lo Clan
Fan Cailai or Hoan Tjai Loy married to The Sin Keng, son of Luitenant der Chinezen The Tjiauw Yong te Cheribon

Notes

See also

History of the Song dynasty
Culture of the Song dynasty
Grand chancellor (China)

References

 

Book of Gaoping Fan Clan Genealogy

External links

http://www.silkqin.com/09hist/qinshi/fanzhongyan.htm
http://www.cctv.com/program/civilization/20040406/101759.shtml
https://web.archive.org/web/20050408200139/http://chinapage.com/poet-e/fanzhongyan2e.html
http://www.chinese-literature.org/lyrics/Fan-zhongyan
Fan Zhongyan Poems & Ci

989 births
1052 deaths
11th-century Chinese poets
Poets from Jiangsu
Politicians from Suzhou
Song dynasty chancellors
Song dynasty philosophers
11th-century Chinese philosophers
Song dynasty poets
Song dynasty politicians from Jiangsu
Writers from Suzhou
Chinese reformers